The Reichenberg Fellowship is a German non-denominational ecumenical community. In German it is called the Offensive Junger Christen (OJC) e.V.. It belongs to the EKD and is situated in Reichelsheim in the Odenwald and in Greifswald. They are known externally as one of the last remaining supporters of conversion therapy, which is acknowledged as an abusive practice by all professional psychiatric and psychological organisations, most notably they supported such therapy on children until the German law changed in 2020.

History 
The community was founded by Irmela and Horst-Klaus Hofmann as a contrast movement to the Protests of 1968. Horst-Klaus Hofmann was executive secretary of the YMCA-Mannheim and held Christian youth meetings in the offices of the Evangelical Sisterhood of Mary in Darmstadt. They invited students to share their family life in their home in Bensheim, Odenwald. The family grew to an extended family and subsequently to a Christian community. They moved to Reichelsheim, Odenwald and bought the Reichenberg castle.

Since 1999 the community defines itself as ecumenical.

Organization 
The community is led by Prior Konstantin Mascher and consists of about 42 full members.

The Reichenberg Fellowship is member of the EKD charity organization Diakonie and of the German Association of Youth Missionary Movements. The “Reichelsheim European Youth Center” is Chapter of YMCA.

The German Institute for Youth and Society, (Deutsches Institut für Jugend und Gesellschaft (DIJG)) is the OJC's center for study and research. Director was Christl Ruth Vonholdt. Arthur A. Goldberg is one of its advisory council members.

The Reichenberg Fellowship operates mainly on donations.

Basic activities 
The Fellowship exists of

 Reichenberg Castle with
 field of experience,
 Schlosscafé and
 the gothic St. Michael's Chapel,
 the Reichelsheim European Youth Center (REZ) with local and regional YMCA-Youth Work and international youth conferences consisting of
 the program pub ″Jig″
 a youth hostel
 trips and camps
 the Wellhouse (Quellhaus), with two families and four singles building a residential community
 the Felsengrund multigenerational house
 the seminar for biblical counselling with
 counselling training,
 the journal Brennpunkt Seelsorge for Pastoral care
 lectures
 the German Institute for Youth and Society (Deutsches Institut für Jugend und Gesellschaft, abbreviated DIJG) with scientific studies and publications, the journal "Bulletin" and
 the OJC community in Greifswald with the Biblical counselling action committee, conferences and community ministries
 a library

International activities 
The supporting non-profit association today has outreach ministries in Argentina, Bosnia and Herzegovina, Russia, Iraq, Congo, Mexico, Pakistan, the Philippines, Fidschi and Honduras in development cooperation as NGO.

Since 1993, the Reichenberg Fellowship has led international building camps in Germany, Macedonia, Croatia and Russia. The young people between the ages of 16 and 26 have had the opportunity to work with others of different nationality, confession and language.

German Institute for Youth and Society 
The German Institute for Youth and Society (Deutsches Institut für Jugend und Gesellschaft) was led by Christl Ruth Vonholdt; this position is presently vacant. The institute is the apologetic branch of the Reichenberg Fellowship. It publishes its own research and translates English publications into German.

The institute cooperates with the following organisations:

 American Anglican Council, Washington, D.C., US
 Institut ekumenických studií v Praze, Prague, Czech Republic
 Institute on Religion and Democracy, Washington, D.C., US
 Odwaga, Lublin, Polen (R.C., relating to Catholic writings and Richard Cohen)
 Oxford Centre for Mission Studies, Oxford, U.K.
 The Alliance for Therapeutic Choice and Scientific Integrity (ATCSI), US

Publishing activities 
The OJC publishes the journals Salzkorn. Anstiftung zum gemeinsamen Christenleben ("Grain of Salt", for friends and supporters, 4 times a year), Brennpunkt Seelsorge. Beiträge zur biblischen Lebensberatung ("Focus: Counselling" 2 times a year).

Members of the community including Irmela Hofmann, Horst-Klaus Hofmann, Christl Ruth Vonholdt, Klaus Sperr, Ute and Frank Paul have also published several books themselves.

 Differentielle Wirkungen der Praxis der Transzendentalen Meditation (TM) - Eine empirische Analyse pathogener Strukturen als Hilfe für die Beratung. Bensheim 1980, Selbstverlag
 Translation of: D. Mitchell Whitman: Brecht das Schweigen. Sexuelle Gewalt gegen Kinder. Titel der amerikanischen Originalausgabe: Child sexual abuse. An overview and teaching manual for clergy and other Christian leaders. Neukirchen-Vluyn 1993,  
 Offensive Junger Christen: Homosexualität und christliche Seelsorge. Dokumentation eines ökumenischen Symposiums. Veranstaltet vom Deutschen Institut für Jugend und Gesellschaft (OJC), Reichelsheim. Offensive Junger Christen/Aussaat Verlag, Neukirchen-Vluyn 1995, 
 Christl Ruth Vonholdt (Ed.): Striving for Gender Identity: Homosexuals and Christian Counseling. A workbook for the Church. Reichelsheim 1996, Selbstverlag
 Ralph Pechmann und Martin Reppenhagen (Hrsg.): Mission im Widerspruch. Religionstheologische Fragen heute und Mission morgen. Eine Veröffentlichung des Deutschen Instituts für Jugend und Gesellschaft. Neukirchen-Vluyn 1999, 
 Ralph Pechmann und Martin Reppenhagen (Hrsg.): Zeugnis im Dialog der Religionen und der Postmoderne. Eine Veröffentlichung des Deutschen Instituts für Jugend und Gesellschaft. Neukirchen-Vluyn 1999, 
 Ute und Frank Paul: Begleiten statt erobern. Missionare als Gäste im nordargentinischen Chaco. Neufeld-Verlag 2010
 Klaus Sperr: Herzschlag. Anstöße zu den Wochensprüchen des Kirchenjahres. fontis-Verlag 2014
 Ute Paul: Die Rückkehr der Zikade. Vom Leben am anderen Ende der Welt. Neufeld-Verlag 2015

Sources 
 general

 German Institute for Youth and Society

External links 
Reichelsheim Fellowship (German)
German Institute for Youth and Society with publications in English and German

Nondenominational Christian societies and communities
Christian monasticism
Organizations in the ex-gay movement
Christian organizations established in 1968
Christian ecumenical organizations